V. Sasi (Malayalam: വി. ശശി) is a member of 13th Kerala Legislative Assembly, and 14th Kerala Legislative Assembly. He was the Deputy Speaker of KLA from  2016 to 2021. He belongs to Communist Party of India and represents Chirayinkeezhu constituency.

Career
Sasi was in public service for nearly three decades holding senior positions in government; provided effective direction and governance for the all round development of traditional sectors such as coir, handloom, cashew etc. Served as director, managing director and chairman of various public sector undertakings; member, board of directors, National Textile Corporation, Coir Board; private secretary to Shri. P. K. Raghavan, the Minister for SC/ST development in E. K. Nayanar Ministry; planned, co-ordinated and implemented various development schemes for SC/ST; served as chairman, Kerala Agricultural Workers Welfare Fund Board (2006-2009); Member, Travancore Devaswom Board.

Personal life
He was born on 12 May 1950 to A. Velu and K. Sarada. He has a bachelor's degree in Engineering. He is married to Suma and has 2 children.

References

Members of the Kerala Legislative Assembly
Communist Party of India politicians from Kerala
1950 births
Living people
People from Thiruvananthapuram district
Deputy Speakers of the Kerala Legislative Assembly